Carlos Alberto García González (born 8 July 1971) is a Mexican politician affiliated with the PAN. He currently serves as Deputy of the LXII Legislature of the Mexican Congress representing Tamaulipas. He also served as Deputy during the LX Legislature.

References

1971 births
Living people
People from Matamoros, Tamaulipas
National Action Party (Mexico) politicians
21st-century Mexican politicians
Politicians from Tamaulipas
Deputies of the LXII Legislature of Mexico
Members of the Chamber of Deputies (Mexico) for Tamaulipas